Sabule is a settlement in Kenya's Wajir County. Surrounding settlements are Dadaab (south east), Atelier Novias (south), Sushico (south west)

References 

Populated places in North Eastern Province (Kenya)
Wajir County